The Mineshaft was a members-only BDSM gay leather bar and sex club located at 835 Washington Street, at Little West 12th Street, in Manhattan, New York City, in the Meatpacking District, West Village, and Greenwich Village sections.

History
Among those who frequented the Mineshaft were author Jack Fritscher (who was present at its opening night and attended hundreds of times), Fritscher's lover Robert Mapplethorpe (who took many pictures of the Mineshaft and was at one point its official photographer ... "After dinner I go to the Mineshaft."), gay erotic artist Rex, and Annie Sprinkle, who said she was one of three women ever allowed in. One of the other women was Camille O'Grady. Manager Wally Wallace (born James Wallace) said that he turned away Mick Jagger, and a bouncer turned away Rudolf Nureyev.  Vincente Minnelli, Rainer Werner Fassbinder, Rock Hudson, and Michel Foucault got in.

There was no sign on the entrance; the exterior has been described as "grimy". The location had previously been used by a gay bar, Zodiac. The entrance to the club was up a flight of stairs, on the second floor. The door was staffed by someone who rejected anyone wearing preppie clothes or cologne, and this was a widely known part of what made the bar influential. Originally the Mineshaft was on that one floor (and with a scat room, which was soon abandoned as too extreme). It soon expanded to the first floor beneath, using back stairs to access a recreation of a jail cell, the back of a truck, dungeons, and a room containing spotlighted bathtubs in which men could let other men urinate on them.

The upper floor or bar (no alcohol was sold, for legal reasons) had a roof deck, dungeons, slings, and cans of Crisco, at the time popular among gay men as a sexual lubricant preceding modern personal lubricant. Nudity or minimal clothing was encouraged, and a clothes check was provided. Recreational drug use was common inside the club. According to the Mineshaft Newsletter, Fist Fuckers of America held meetings there. There was a wall of glory holes. Promiscuity was celebrated.

The images and posters for the club were created by the gay erotic artist Rex.

The existence of the Mineshaft was widely known among gays who never visited; it has been called a "mythic[al]...space".

The Mineshaft operated from October 8, 1976, until it was closed by the New York City Department of Health on November 7, 1985, although tax problems played a significant role in its closing. After it closed, six men, associated with both the Mineshaft and an affiliated heterosexual club, the Hellfire, were charged with a variety of crimes. Four pleaded guilty, former New York City police officer Richard Bell was convicted, and the sixth fled the country to escape prosecution.

The Leather Archives and Museum holds the records of the Mineshaft.

Dress code
A sign said the following:
The Mine Shaft dress code
as adopted by the club on October 1, 1976
is to be followed during the year 1978.
The Board of Directors

Approved dress includes the following:
Cycle leather & Western gear, levis
Jocks, action ready wear, uniforms,
T shirts, plaid shirts, just plain shirts,
Club overlays, patches, & sweat.
NO COLOGNES or PERFUMES
NO SUITS, TIES, DRESS PANTS
NO RUGBY SHIRTS, DESIGNER SWEATERS, or TUXEDOS
NO DISCO DRAG or DRESSES
also
NO HEAVY OUTTER [sic] WEAR IS TO BE WORN IN PLAYGROUND
NOTE: The code was designed for particular men who compose the basic core of our club

Popular culture
The Al Pacino movie Cruising was intended to depict gay cruising as it existed at the Mineshaft, though the bar is not named in the movie. Since the Mineshaft would not allow filming, scenes from the movie were filmed at the Hellfire Club, which was decorated to resemble the Mineshaft. Regulars from the Mineshaft appeared as extras. Scenes were shot in streets and other locations near the Mineshaft. Pacino attended as part of researching his role. (A bar called the Mineshaft does not appear in the 1970 novel Cruising by Gerald Walker, which, with substantial changes, was the inspiration for the 1980 film of the same name.)

According to Jack Fritscher, Jacques Morali drew his inspiration for the four archetypes of the Village People from the Mineshaft's dress code. Glenn Hughes, the original leather biker of the Village People, frequently attended.

Freddie Mercury wears a Mineshaft T-shirt in the official video for the Queen song “Don't Stop Me Now“, as does Brooks Ashmanskas' character Stanley in Episode 5 of the Netflix series Uncoupled.

References

Further reading
 

1976 establishments in New York City
1985 disestablishments in New York (state)
Defunct LGBT drinking establishments in New York City
Defunct LGBT nightclubs in New York (state)
Gay male BDSM
Leather bars and clubs
West Village